Western Norway University of Applied Sciences or HVL is a Norwegian public institution of higher education, established in January 2017 through the merging of formerly independent colleges across five campuses: Bergen, Førde, Haugesund, Sogndal and Stord. Its oldest programs - teacher education in Stord - can be traced to 1839. The total number of students at HVL is about 16000, and there are 1800 academic and administrative staff. Its main campus is in the Kronstad neighborhood of Bergen, Norway.

Western Norway University of Applied Sciences provides professional education within health and social sciences, engineering, economic and administrative science, music and teaching. It offers education on the Bachelor and Master levels, continuing education, and on the Doctoral (PhD) level. Around 2700 students graduate with degrees from HVL every year.

In June, 2016, after more than one year of negotiations, the executive leadership of three west Norwegian higher education institutions – Bergen University College, Stord/Haugesund University College, and Sogn og Fjordane University College – officially announced their decision to merge. From 2017, the English name is Western Norway University of Applied Sciences (abbreviated according to the Norwegian name: HVL).

The founding Rector (President) was professor Berit Rokne, and in 2021 Gunnar Yttri, a historian, was appointed the institution’s Rector for the period 2021-2024.

Faculties 
The college is organised in four faculties:

Faculty of Education, Arts and Sports
Faculty of Engineering and Science
Faculty of Health and Social Sciences
Faculty of Business Administration and Social Sciences

Centres 
HVL emphasizes professional studies, but also offers postgraduate programs through the doctoral level in some fields, and currently has ten research centers   to support its specialized postgraduate programs, providing opportunities for PhD research:

 Centre for Evidence-Based Practice
 Centre for Arts, Culture, and Communication
 The Mohn Centre of Innovation and Regional Development
 Centre for Care Research, Western Norway
 Centre for Educational Research
KINDknow - Kindergarten Knowledge Centre for Systemic Research on Diversity and Sustainable Futures
The Centre for Health Research
The Norwegian National Centre for Food, Health and Physical Activity
Centre for Creativities, Arts and Science in Education
Maritime Research Centre

There is also a Centre for New Media.

Norwegian diver school 
The Norwegian diver school was a public diving school for professional divers located in Gravdal, Bergen, Norway. Established in 1980, it was merged and became part of Bergen University College (now part of the Western Norway University of Applied Sciences) in 2005. The diving school is a part of the Faculty of Engineering and Science, and is located in Skålevik, approximately 15 kilometers from Bergen city centre.

See also

References

External links
HiB in English
Research at HVL (in English)
HVL in English

 
Education in Bergen
Educational institutions established in 1994
1994 establishments in Norway
Schools in Bergen
Underwater diving training organizations
1980 establishments in Norway
2005 disestablishments in Norway